Luana Tamara de Oliveira Vicente (born 30 January 1994) is a Brazilian badminton player who won a silver medal at the 2015 Pan American Games.

Personal life 
Vicente was born on 30 January 1994 in Rio de Janeiro, Brazil. Her younger sister Lohaynny Vicente is also an international badminton player. When Luana was six, her father, a drug dealer, was killed in a shootout with police. Following her father's death her mother moved the family from the west of the city to Chacrinha, a favela in the north of Rio. She now lives with her sister in Campinas, São Paulo, in a house funded by the Brazilian Badminton Federation.

Career 
Both Vicente and her sister began playing badminton through a programme set up by a coach to teach the sport to kids in the community.

Vicente won a silver medal in the women's doubles at the 2015 Pan American Games held in Toronto, Ontario, Canada, playing alongside her sister . The pair defeated Daigenis Saturria and Bermary Polanco of the Dominican Republic in the quarterfinals then Alex Bruce and Phyllis Chan of Canada in the semifinals. In the final they lost to the American pairing of Eva Lee and Paula Lynn Obañana by a score of 14−21, 6−21, to finish as runners-up.

Vicente competed at the 2018 South American Games, winning the gold medal in the team event, and also the silver medals in the women's and mixed doubles event.

Achievements

Pan American Games 
Women's doubles

Pan Am Championships 
Women's doubles

South American Games 
Women's doubles

Mixed doubles

BWF International Challenge/Series 
Women's singles

Women's doubles

Mixed doubles

  BWF International Challenge tournament
  BWF International Series tournament
  BWF Future Series tournament

References

External links 
 

1994 births
Living people
Sportspeople from Rio de Janeiro (city)
Brazilian female badminton players
Badminton players at the 2011 Pan American Games
Badminton players at the 2015 Pan American Games
Pan American Games silver medalists for Brazil
Pan American Games medalists in badminton
South American Games gold medalists for Brazil
South American Games silver medalists for Brazil
South American Games medalists in badminton
Competitors at the 2018 South American Games
Medalists at the 2015 Pan American Games
21st-century Brazilian women
20th-century Brazilian women